Syllitus adonarensis is a species of beetle in the family Cerambycidae. It was described by Jordan in 1894.

References

Stenoderini
Beetles described in 1894